Cloniella is a genus of bush crickets in the subfamily Saginae with species found in Africa.

Species 

The following species are recognised in the genus Cloniella:

 Cloniella praedatoria (Distant, 1892) - type species (as Hemisaga praedatoria Distant)
 Cloniella zambesica Kaltenbach, 1971

References 

Tettigoniidae
Tettigoniidae genera